Weepah Spring Wilderness is a  wilderness area in Lincoln and Nye Counties, in the U.S. state of Nevada.

Weepah Spring Wilderness contains Timber Mountain and lies within the Seaman Range, an excellent example of a Great Basin mountain range.  It lacks a single defined ridgeline and contains isolated peaks, maze-like canyons, walls of fossil bearing rocks, natural arches, and volcanic hoodoos.  The Wilderness also has the largest stand of ponderosa pine in eastern Nevada and 4,000-year-old rock art.

Archeology
Within the Weepah Springs Wilderness is the White River Narrows Archaeological District, listed on the National Register of Historic Places.  The district encompasses one of the largest and most well-known concentrations of petroglyphs in Nevada.  Other prehistoric sites in the District include shelter caves, hunting blinds, and campsites.

See also
List of wilderness areas in Nevada
List of U.S. Wilderness Areas
Wilderness Act

References

External links
Nevada Bureau of Land Management - Weepah Spring Wilderness fact sheet
Friends of Nevada Wilderness - Weepah Spring Wilderness
Nevada Bureau of Land Management - Weepah Spring Wilderness map

Wilderness areas of Nevada
Protected areas of Lincoln County, Nevada
Protected areas of Nye County, Nevada
Bureau of Land Management areas in Nevada
Protected areas of the Great Basin
Protected areas established in 2004
2004 establishments in Nevada